Adad-nirari II (reigned from 911 to 891 BC) was the first King of Assyria in the Neo-Assyrian period.

Biography
Adad-nirari II's father was Ashur-dan II, whom he succeeded after a minor dynastic struggle. It is probable that the accession encouraged revolts amongst Assyria's nominal vassals.

He firmly subjugated the areas previously under only nominal Assyrian vassalage, conquering and deporting troublesome Arameans following a battle at the junction of the Khabur and Euphrates in 910 BC. After subduing Neo-Hittite and Hurrian populations in the north, Adad-nirari II then twice attacked and defeated Shamash-mudammiq of Babylonia, annexing a large area of land north of the Diyala River and the towns of Hīt and Zanqu in mid Mesopotamia in the same year. He made further gains over Babylonia under Nabu-shuma-ukin I later in his reign. He also campaigned to the west, subjugating the Aramean cities of Kadmuh and Nisibin. Along with vast amounts of treasure collected, he also secured the Kabur river region. His reign was a period of returning prosperity to the Middle East region following expansion of Phoenician and Aramaean trade routes, linking Anatolia, Egypt under the Libyan 22nd Dynasty, Mesopotamia and the Mediterranean.

Adad-nirari II's son was named Tukulti-Ninurta II who continued to wage war against Assyria's enemies.

Because of the existence of full eponym lists from Adad-nirari II's reign down to the middle of the reign of Ashurbanipal in the 7th century BC, year one of his reign in 911 BC is perhaps the first event in ancient Near Eastern history which can be dated to an exact year, although the Assyrian King List is generally considered to be quite accurate for several centuries before Adad-nirari's reign, and scholars generally agree on a single set of dates back to Ashur-resh-ishi I in the late 12th century BC.

References

10th-century BC births
891 BC deaths
10th-century BC Assyrian kings
9th-century BC Assyrian kings
Year of birth unknown
Kings of the Universe

sv:Assyriska kungar#Nyassyriska perioden